Shell Rock is a city in Butler County, Iowa, United States, along the Shell Rock River. The population was 1,268 at the time of the 2020 census.   The city is located along the county's eastern border, between Butler and Bremer counties.

Geography
Shell Rock is located at  (42.711033, -92.583471).

Demographics

2010 census
As of the census of 2010, there were 1,296 people, 554 households, and 363 families living in the city. The racial makeup of the city was 97.5% White, 0.4% Native American, 0.2% Asian, 0.3% from other races, and 1.6% from two or more races. Hispanic or Latino of any race were 1.2% of the population.

There were 554 households, of which 27.4% had children under the age of 18 living with them, 53.8% were married couples living together, 6.9% had a female householder with no husband present, 4.9% had a male householder with no wife present, and 34.5% were non-families. 30.9% of all households were made up of individuals, and 15.7% had someone living alone who was 65 years of age or older. The average household size was 2.26 and the average family size was 2.81.

The median age in the city was 44.1 years. 21.3% of residents were under the age of 18; 6.6% were between the ages of 18 and 24; 23.4% were from 25 to 44; 29% were from 45 to 64; and 19.7% were 65 years of age or older. The gender makeup of the city was 49.0% male and 51.0% female.

2000 census
As of the census of 2000, there were 1,298 people, 535 households, and 367 families living in the city. The racial makeup of the city was 98.38% White, 0.15% African American, 0.39% Asian, 0.08% from other races, and 1.00% from two or more races. Hispanic or Latino of any race were 0.23% of the population.

There were 535 households, out of which 29.7% had children under the age of 18 living with them, 59.1% were married couples living together, 7.3% had a female householder with no husband present, and 31.4% were non-families. 28.8% of all households were made up of individuals, and 12.7% had someone living alone who was 65 years of age or older. The average household size was 2.34 and the average family size was 2.87.

In the city, the population was spread out, with 22.0% under the age of 18, 8.2% from 18 to 24, 24.9% from 25 to 44, 26.3% from 45 to 64, and 18.6% who were 65 years of age or older. The median age was 42 years. For every 100 females, there were 95.8 males. For every 100 females age 18 and over, there were 89.5 males.

The median income for a household in the city was $36,823, and the median income for a family was $44,265. Males had a median income of $31,250 versus $22,596 for females. The per capita income for the city was $17,064. About 5.1% of families and 7.2% of the population were below the poverty line, including 9.3% of those under age 18 and 5.5% of those age 65 or over.

Education
The Waverly-Shell Rock Community School District operates local public schools.

References

Cities in Butler County, Iowa
Cities in Iowa